Hellman & Friedman LLC (H&F) is an American private equity firm, founded in 1984 by Warren Hellman and Tully Friedman, that makes investments primarily through leveraged buyouts as well as growth capital investments. H&F has focused its efforts on several core target industries including media, financial services, professional services and information services.  The firm tends to avoid asset intensive or other industrial businesses (e.g., manufacturing, chemicals, transportation). H&F is based in San Francisco, with offices in New York and London.

History

Founding
Hellman & Friedman was founded in 1984 by Warren Hellman and Tully Friedman.  Before H&F, Hellman was a founding partner of Hellman, Ferri Investment Associates, which would later be renamed Matrix Management Company.  Today, Matrix is among the most prominent venture capital firms in the U.S.  Before that, Hellman worked in investment banking at Lehman Brothers, where he served as president as well as head of the Investment Banking Division and Chairman of Lehman Corporation. Tully Friedman was formerly a managing director at Salomon Brothers.  In 1997, Friedman left the firm to found Friedman Fleischer & Lowe, a private equity firm also based in San Francisco.

Recent
As of 2011, H&F employed approximately 50 investment professionals, including 15 managing directors, 6 principals and 13 associates as well as senior advisors and general counsels. In August 2013, the firm acquired Canada's largest insurance broker, Hub International, for around $4.4 billion. In March 2014, the firm acquired Renaissance Learning, a firm providing assessment methods such as electronic tests that adapt questions in real time depending on how successfully the student is answering, for $1.1 billion in cash.

In February 2015, it was announced that Hellman & Friedman were putting together a takeover bid for used car company Auto Trader, which could amount to an offer of £2 billion. On May 18, 2017, Hellman & Friedman made a A$2.9 billion bid for Fairfax Media in Australia, starting a bidding war with TPG Group for the company.

In May 2016, H&F agreed to a deal to acquire the healthcare cost management company MultiPlan Inc. for about $7.5 billion.

In June 2018, it was announced that Hellman & Friedman were taking a controlling interest in the security monitoring company, SimpliSafe.

In February 2019, it was announced that Hellman & Friedman purchased Ultimate Software for $11 billion, an all-cash transaction. Ultimate Software has since been combined with Kronos Incorporated, and rolled into the brand Ultimate Kronos Group. In December 2019, Hellman & Friedman acquired AutoScout24, a European automotive digital marketplace, for 2.9 billion euros ($3.2 billion) from Scout24.

In 2020, Hellman & Friedman joined Diligent Corporation's Modern Leadership Initiative and pledged to create five new board roles among its portfolio companies for racially diverse candidates.

In July 2021, it was announced that Hellman & Friedman purchased At Home.

In November 2021, H&F and Bain Capital agreed to buy AthenaHealth for $17 Billion.

Notable holdings
A core element in H&F's strategy is investing in "growth" opportunities whether in an industry sector or a specific company.  H&F invests in a variety of structures, frequently making minority investments with only limited controls. Additionally, H&F has taken a number of unconventional steps to finance and close transactions, including arranging and syndicating the financing for several investments including Getty Images and Goodman Global.

Since closing its sixth private equity fund in 2007, H&F has been active in making new investments:
DoubleClick
Goodman Global
Gartmore
Texas Genco
GCM Grosvenor 
Nielsen Company
Nasdaq
Internet Brands
OpenLink
PPD
SSP Holdings
 Web Reservations International (Hostelworld)
 UKG

Investment funds
H&F invests through a series of private equity funds (structured as limited partnerships) and its investors include a variety of pension funds, endowments and other institutional investors:

 1984 — Hellman & Friedman I
 1991 — Hellman & Friedman II ($826 million)
 1995 — Hellman & Friedman III ($1.5 billion)
 2000 — Hellman & Friedman IV ($2.2 billion)
 2004 — Hellman & Friedman V ($3.5 billion)
 2007 — Hellman & Friedman VI ($8.4 billion)
 2011 — Hellman & Friedman VII ($8.8 billion)
 2014 — Hellman & Friedman VIII ($10.9 billion)
2018 — Hellman & Friedman IX ($16.5 billion)
2021 — Hellman & Friedman X ($24.4 billion)
Source: Preqin

See also   

 List of venture capital firms

References

External links
 
 Hellman & Friedman: The Deal Journal PE Firm of the Quarter (WSJ.com, 2008)

Private equity firms of the United States
Companies based in San Francisco
Financial services companies established in 1984
Hellman family
AI based human capital management solutions